Rimgailė (also Rymgajla, Rimgaila, Ringaila) was daughter of Birutė and Kęstutis, Grand Duke of Lithuania, and thus sister of Vytautas the Great. Rimgailė (feminine) or Rimgailas (masculine) is a typical dual-stemmed pagan Lithuanian name constructed from rim- (rimti - "be calm") + gail- (*gailas - "strong"), which is quite common in Lithuania at present.

By marriage with Henry of Masovia, she was Princess of Masovia for about one year, until the death of her husband (winter of 1392–1393). Jan Długosz in his chronicles wrote that to marry her Henry resigned from the title of Bishop of Płock. She was among the suspects in the death of Henry.

Her second marriage (1419–1421) was with Alexander the Good, Voivode of Moldavia (1400–1432). Upon the politically motivated divorce she was given the customs of the town of Siret and  40 villages. Also, as part of the divorce settlement Alexander the Good promised to pay her lifetime income worth 600 Hungarian gold ducats or florins payable in two installments.

See also

References

Medieval Lithuanian nobility
Medieval Romanian nobility
14th-century Romanian people 
15th-century Romanian people 
14th-century Romanian women 
15th-century Romanian women 
14th-century Lithuanian people 
15th-century Lithuanian people 
14th-century Lithuanian women 
15th-century Lithuanian women